The Atlanta Fringe Festival was conceived in 2010 by a small group of art and theatre lovers. The festival debuted in Atlanta, Georgia. May 9–13, 2012. The festival has attracted performers from all over the United States, including actors, dancers, comedians and aerialists.  In its inaugural year, the Atlanta Fringe Festival received over 40 performance submissions. Like the original Fringe Festival in Edinburgh, Scotland, the Atlanta Fringe is a non-juried event that showcases both professional and experimental theatre. AFF is currently accepting submissions for the second annual edition of the festival, slated for June 6–9, 2013.

Features

Non-juried performances
The Atlanta Fringe Festival is nonjuried—judges do not select the shows appearing in the festival. Instead, the performers submitted applications and were chosen by lottery.  In 2012, there will be 29 opportunities to see the shows offered by the festival. During the Atlanta Fringe, the performances will be available at six venues including Beacon Dance, Core Dance, Mask Center, Horizons School Theatre, Horizons School Gym and Wonderroot.

Radio Fringe
The Atlanta Fringe Festival is the first Fringe to have a radio play component. The audio submissions will be made available on the festival’s website. There is a $2 fee for listeners to gain access to Radio Fringe. The categories for Radio Fringe include radio plays, storytelling and sound art. The artists were selected on a first-come, first-served basis.

Easter Art Hunt
On March 31, 2012 the Atlanta Fringe Festival hosted its inaugural Easter Art Hunt in Grant Park, the fourth largest park in Atlanta. At this event, participants searched for and kept free artwork from Atlanta-area artists. Hundreds of people found over 100 art pieces hidden throughout Grant Park.

AFF workshops
Early in 2012, the Atlanta Fringe offered five business workshops for artists. The workshop facilitators were professionals in their respective areas. The topics discussed at the workshops were managing volunteers, producing a show, copyrighting original works, grant writing and corporate funding.

Steering Committee
Diana Brown, Executive Director

Molly Kristyn, Director of Operations

Cherry DelRosario, Design Director

Brittany Harper, Marketing & Ticketing Manager

Michael Tesney, Radio Director

Rachel Teagle, Volunteer Coordinator

Evelyn Danielle, Workshop Coordinator

Nadia Morgan, Production Coordinator

Jessica L. Bodiford, Development Coordinator

Armond Brown, Development Coordinator

Laura Bayless, Hospitality Coordinator

Tessa Buffington, Legal Liaison

External links
 
 Lineup announced by the Atlanta Journal-Constitution
 Article about the Atlanta Fringe from ArtsCriticsATL
 Photo Essay from the Atlanta Fringe Reveal Party from BurnAway
 Atlanta Locals Create Performing Arts Festival
 Fringe is Coming to Atlanta: a video from CBS
 Daring to Fringe, Breakthrough Magazine’s conversation with Rachel Teagle from the Atlanta Fringe
 Daniel Guyton
 The Circle Ensemble Theatre

Festivals in Atlanta
Fringe festivals in the United States
Festivals established in 2010
2010 establishments in Georgia (U.S. state)